Robert E. Lee Campground is a United States Forest Service campground in the Boise National Forest about  east of the state capital, Boise. It is situated at North Fork Boise River river mile 19, at the confluence of Robert E. Lee Creek, a short tributary. The campground and creek, both named for General Robert E. Lee, are the only two Confederate memorials in the U.S. state of Idaho.

References

Further reading

Campgrounds in Idaho
Boise National Forest
Monuments and memorials to Robert E. Lee